is a Japanese brown rice green tea consisting of green tea mixed with roasted popped brown rice. It is sometimes referred to colloquially as "popcorn tea" because a few grains of the rice pop during the roasting process and resemble popcorn, or as "people's tea", as the rice served as a filler and reduced the price of the tea, making it historically more available for poorer Japanese. Today all segments of society drink genmaicha. It was also used by people fasting for religious purposes or who found themselves to be between meals for long periods of time.

The sugar and starch from the rice cause the tea to have a warm, full, nutty flavor. It is considered easy to drink and to make the stomach feel better. 
Tea steeped from genmaicha has a light yellow hue. Its flavor is mild and combines the fresh grassy flavor of green tea with the aroma of the roasted rice.

Genmaicha is also sold with matcha (powdered green tea) added to it. This product is called  (lit. genmaicha with added powdered tea). Matcha-iri genmaicha has a similar flavor to plain genmaicha, but the flavor is often stronger and the color more green than light yellow.

In South Korea, a very similar tea is called hyeonminokcha ("brown rice green tea"), while the word hyeonmicha, which is a cognate of genmaicha, refers to an infusion of roasted brown rice in boiling water.

See also

List of Japanese green teas
Mugicha, a tisane made from roasted barley
Roasted grain drink

References 

Japanese tea
Rice drinks
Green tea